The E14 munition was a cardboard sub-munition (air-dropped or ground-launched munitions that eject smaller submunitions) developed by the United States biological weapons program as an anti-crop weapon. In a series of field tests in 1955, the E14 was loaded with fleas and air-dropped.

History
The E14 munition was developed by the United States for use in its offensive biological warfare arsenal as an anti-crop weapon. After the Korean War U.S. interest in large-scale entomological warfare increased. The E14 was one of two sub-munitions used in large-scale testing aimed at learning the feasibility and result of an air-dropped insect attack. 

In September 1954, at Dugway Proving Ground in Utah, the E14 was again used in a series of tests known as "Operation Big Itch". During Big Itch, uninfected rat fleas (Xenopsylla cheopis) were loaded into the E14 and air-dropped over the proving ground.

The E14 used cardboard and sponge inserts to hold the fleas inside the cardboard container. With the sponge inserts in place, the E14 could hold about 100,000 fleas. Eighty cardboard inserts, or "loop tubes", could be carried in the E14 as well. The munition could hold 80 loop tubes, each one capable of holding 3,000 fleas. The testing in Utah was ultimately successful.

In May 1955 the U.S. utilized the E14 in field test, this time in the U.S. state of Georgia. The E14 was packed with "aircomb waffles" or loop tubes, instead of fleas these tests used uninfected yellow fever mosquitoes (Aedes aegypti). The successful Georgia trials were known as "Operation Big Buzz".

Specifications
The E14 munition was a sub-munition that can be clustered in the E86 cluster bomb. Internally the bomb contained an actuator powered by pressurized carbon dioxide, a piston that would expel the bomb's contents, and a small parachute, to be deployed when the weapon was dropped from the E86 cluster bomb.

See also
E120 bomblet
E23 munition
E61 anthrax bomblet
Flettner rotor bomblet
M143 bomblet

Notes

References
Trivedi, Janki. "Xenopsylla cheopis", Animal Diversity Web, University of Michigan Museum of Zoology, 2003, accessed December 28, 2008.
Russell, R.C., "Aedes aegypti ", from A colour photo atlas of mosquitoes of Southeastern Australia, 1996, via the Department of Medical Entomology, University of Sydney and Westmead Hospital, accessed December 28, 2008.

Biological weapon delivery systems
Submunitions
Cold War weapons of the United States
Biological anti-agriculture weapons